Glenwood station is a commuter rail stop on the Metro-North Railroad's Hudson Line, located in the Glenwood neighborhood of Yonkers, New York.

Station layout
The station has two slightly offset high-level side platforms each able to accommodate eight cars.

Abandoned power plant 

Between the Glenwood station and the Hudson River lies the abandoned Yonkers Power Station of the New York Central & Hudson River Railroad, a massive building which was constructed in 1907 to hold electrical generators to provide power for the electrification of the railroad. 

In 2008 the Preservation League of New York State named the plant as one of the seven most endangered sites in the state, and in 2013 the building began to be renovated into the "PowerHouse", an "arts-focused event complex with eventual plans for restaurants, a hotel and a marina." Phase One of the conversion is expected to finish in 2016 at the cost of $70 million, while Phase Two, which includes the restaurant, hotel and marina, is expected to cost $80 million, and could take up to ten years to complete.

References

External links 

 Entrance from Google Maps Street View

Former New York Central Railroad stations
Metro-North Railroad stations in New York (state)
Transportation in Yonkers, New York
Railway stations in Westchester County, New York